The String Quartet No. 6 (D 74) in D major was composed by Franz Schubert in 1813.

Movements
 Allegro ma non troppo (D major)
 Andante (G major)
 Menuetto: Allegro (D major, with Trio in D major)
 Allegro (D major)

Sources
 Franz Schubert's Works, Series V: Streichquartette edited by Joseph Hellmesberger and Eusebius Mandyczewski. Breitkopf & Härtel, 1890.
 Otto Erich Deutsch (and others). Schubert Thematic Catalogue (several editions), No. 74.
 New Schubert Edition, Series VI, Volume 4: String Quartets II edited by Werner Aderhold, Bärenreiter, 1994.

External links 
 

String Quartet No. 06
1813 compositions